Église Saint-Georges de Châtenois is the Catholic parish church of Châtenois, in the Bas-Rhin department of France. The current church was built from 1759 until 1761 by the local architect Martin Dorgler, but retains a Romanesque steeple from the 12th century, crowned with a spire from 1525. It became a registered Monument historique in 1901.

The church houses some notable works of art, classified as Monument historique, among which are two 16th-century polychrome wooden Renaissance reliefs of the Nativity and the Assumption of Mary, and a 1765 pipe organ by Johann Andreas Silbermann.

Gallery

References

Churches in Bas-Rhin
Monuments historiques of Bas-Rhin
Roman Catholic churches completed in 1761
18th-century Roman Catholic church buildings in France